Shohan Rangika (born 18 January 1991) is a Sri Lankan cricketer. He made his first-class debut for Sri Lanka Air Force Sports Club in the 2012–13 Premier Trophy on 1 February 2013.

References

External links
 

1991 births
Living people
Sri Lankan cricketers
Sri Lanka Air Force Sports Club cricketers
Tincomalee District cricketers
People from Ragama